Novonikolayevka is a rural locality (a selo) in Ullubiyevsky Selsoviet, Tarumovsky District, Republic of Dagestan, Russia. The population was 715 as of 2010. There are 8 streets.

Geography 
Novonikolayevka is located 20 km southeast of Tarumovka (the district's administrative centre) by road. Komsomolsky is the nearest rural locality.

References 

Rural localities in Tarumovsky District